John Horton Conway (1937–2020) was an English mathematician at Princeton University, known for Conway's Game of Life.

John Conway may also refer to:

Academia
 John S. Conway (historian) (1929–2017), historian at the University of British Columbia
 John B. Conway (born 1939), American mathematician, functional analyst, George Washington University
 John Conway (astronomer) (born 1963), British radio astronomer

Art
 John S. Conway (artist) (1852–1925), American artist and sculptor
 John Conway (palaeoartist), Australian illustrator
 John Conway (puppeteer) (1922–2003), Canadian television pioneer, creator and performer of Uncle Chichimus and Hollyhock

Politics
 John Conway (died 1579), MP for Flint Boroughs and Flintshire
 Sir John Conway, 2nd Baronet (born 1663), of the Conway baronets, MP for Flintshire and Flint Boroughs
 John R. Conway (1825–1896), U.S. politician

Sports
 John Conway (cricketer) (1842–1909), Australian cricketer and team manager
 John Conway (footballer, born 1951), Irish footballer
 John Conway (Gaelic footballer) (fl. 1968), Gaelic footballer from County Laois, Ireland
 John Conway (boxer) (born 1968), New Zealand boxer

Other uses
 John J. Conway (fl. 1907–1931), American developer in Texas
 John Berchmans Conway (née Bernadette Conway; 1929–2022), Irish Roman Catholic nun working in Pakistan
 John Edwards Conway (1934–2014), U.S. federal judge
 John Conway (born 1977), keyboardist for The Bravery

See also
 Jack Conway (disambiguation)
 Jon Conway (born 1977), American soccer goalkeeper